This is the complete list of Asian Games medalists in sport climbing since 2018.

Men

Speed

Speed relay

Combined

Women

Speed

Speed relay

Combined

References

External links 
 International Federation of Sport Climbing

Sport climbing
medalists